Lovász:

 Lázár Lovász (born 1942), a Hungarian athlete who competed in hammer throw
 László Lovász (born 1948, Budapest), a mathematician, best known for his work in combinatorics,
Lovász conjecture (1970)
 Erdős–Faber–Lovász conjecture (1972)
 The Lovász local lemma (proved in 1975, by László Lovász & P. Erdős)
 The Lenstra–Lenstra–Lovász lattice basis reduction (algorithm) (LLL)
 Algorithmic Lovász local lemma (proved in 2009, by Robin Moser and Gábor Tardos)
 Lovász number (1979)

Hungarian-language surnames